The 1996 Senior League World Series took place from August 11–17 in Kissimmee, Florida, United States. Maracaibo, Venezuela defeated Thousand Oaks, California in the championship game. This would be the final year that 17-time champion Taiwan competed in Senior League Baseball.

Teams

Results

Winner's Bracket

Loser's Bracket

Placement Bracket

Elimination Round

References

Senior League World Series
Senior League World Series
1996 in sports in Florida